Chipiona is a town and municipality located on the Atlantic coast in the province of Cádiz, Spain. According to the 2012 census, the city has a population of 18,849 inhabitants, but this amount increases greatly during the summer holiday period. The town covers an area of 33 km². Being in the lower valley of the River Guadalquivir it is very flat with a maximum terrestrial height of 4 metres. It is bordered on the north-west by Sanlúcar de Barrameda and on the south-east by the port of Rota.

It is the town of birth of singer Rocío Jurado and where her body now rests.

Chipiona is also home to the tallest lighthouse in Spain and the third tallest lighthouse in Europe. The town is also well known for several varieties of Moscatel.

Places of interest

The Chipiona lighthouse is the most emblematic monument of the town. It is the largest lighthouse in Spain, the 3rd in Europe and the 5th in the world. Its height from the base is about 69 meters, dates from 1867 and is located in the Punta del Perro. It was built to prevent the ships having problems accessing the river Guadalquivir and colliding with the Salmedina Stone.
The Marina: early 90s took out the construction of the Marina, located near the mouth of the Guadalquivir, in 2008 is subjected to a process of enlargement.
The Shrine of Our Lady of Regla: The current building of the shrine dates from the early twentieth century, built by the Franciscan missionary community, with the help of the Duke of Montpensier. It originated in an ancient castle fortress of a fourteenth century family (pripiedad Ponce de Leon), who donated it to the hermits of St. Augustine in 1399 to convert it into a church.
Castle Chipiona: houses the "Cadiz and the New World" museum.
Muscat Museum: Opened in 2012. Located in the Cooperative Agricultural Catholic.

History

Antiquity
According to the geographers Strabo (Strabo, III, 1, 9) and Pomponius Mela (Mela, III, 4), of Ancient Greece and Rome respectively, a lighthouse existed at the mouth of the Guadalquivir River called Turris Caepionis.  This was probably because it was built on the orders of the Roman Consul Quintus Servilius Caepion or his successors. The lighthouse marked a dangerous place for shipping and the opening of a navigable river, the Guadalquivir. Chipiona takes its name from the Roman Consul Caepion.

This area has also been identified as the site of the legendary Ars Gerionis, the tomb of Geryon, which stood at the end of a narrow cape that jutted into the sea, probably in what is now a reef known as the Stone of Salmedina, near Salmedina, or just Salmedina. These claims are based solely on the evidence of the literature and Roman archaeological findings dating from the second century B.C.

Middle Ages

Legend relates that the disciples of St. Augustine in Africa, fleeing the invasion of the Vandals, came by sea to Chipiona with the image of the Virgin of Regla. Tombstones have been found near the Shrine of Our Lady of Regla from the time of the Visigoths.  After the islamization of the Iberian Peninsula in 711, according to tradition, the hermits hid the image in a cistern about thirty paces from the citadel, now a monastery. The picture remained hidden in a religious of the Order of St. Augustine until it was found in the 14th century, according to legend, following a revelation from heaven. A Shrine to Our Lady of Regla was built around the cistern.

In 1251 Chipiona was conquered by King Ferdinand III, and again more definitively in 1264 by his son Alfonso X the Wise. In 1297 King Ferdinand IV granted Guzman el Bueno, founder of the House of Medina Sidonia, the Lordship of Sanlúcar, to which Chipiona belonged.

In 1303 the eldest daughter of Guzman el Bueno and Maria Alonso Coronel, Isabel Perez de Guzman, Fernan married Ponce de León, receiving as a dowry the towns of Rota and Chipiona, thereby becoming independent both of the Lordship of Sanlúcar and joining the possessions of the Ponce de León family, germ Arcos House.

Modern Age

In 1755, Chipiona was severely hit by the tsunami that was caused by the Andalusian and Portuguese Atlantic coast Lisbon earthquake. The effects of the tsunami came to town about an hour after the earthquake, killing four people and leaving flooded streets and beaches, estimating the actual damage to 238 815.

He pulled in procession the image of Christ of Mercy to request the withdrawal of the waters, procession that is repeated every year on November, from the chapel that bears the name of Christ to the Cross the Sea.

Earthquake Narration by the Community of the Holy Convent of Nuestra Señora Santa María de Regla, on December 6, 1755

 In the aforementioned November 1 was not noticed any news from sunrise until 10 day time to be serene, and peaceful day, still and calm sea, North Wind insensitive. But, being as 10am, being this Community as high choir solemnly singing the third hour, she began to feel that the choir, and the church with strange swaying motion and this, as noticeable in the view, that lectern, church lamps, candlesticks from the altar, and all the temple shook and moved to a crib mode, from one side to another side, looking to the North and South.

 Advirtióse be a terrible earthquake, and although all the relevant cause fright, and entered the desplomase suspicion that the whole building, which [is] of stone, over us all, lacked the freedom to forsake the choir, tied up all of one impulse, and full of confidence safer Patronage of Our Holy Image, which was patent to the eye in its majestic throne. At the point we bow all knees, and straining our devotion, we continue with the canonical time more consistently.

 It would last the tremor as ten to twelve minutes, knowing the land restitution made her pause, and natural stillness, came the Community to take their seats, each recognizing the Divine Mercy, and the patronage of Our Lady of Rule, Our Lady, we escaped the threatening havoc with such happiness that is not the least harm experienced in all areas of the convent.

 Cantóse conventual Mass without the least suspicion, and concluded, was sung the sixth hour on the end of it, it would be like the 11 and fourth, there was a terrible roar of the sea, and found to be elevated both waves, violently throwing water on said bastion, and on the cliffs of the convent, were overwhelmed by a gunner, who was in it (which did not suffer any damage, having invoked the patronage of Our Holy Image), and fell upon the walls of the convent, and running for their flooded trenches surrounded the Church and its 2 sides to enter through the front door of the Farm, looking to the East.

 Surprised by this unanticipated boost the ocean, some religious who were outside, and within the choir, acceleration fled to the fields, keeping others in the same choir.

Demographics

Source: INE (Spain)

Festivities and traditions

Carnival: Carnival is a celebration with a long tradition in the municipality, the oldest documented reference to it being an 1896 City Council Edict, which regulates the proceedings and confirms that the celebration clearly dates from an earlier era. During the Franco period carnival celebrations were banned in Spain. In 1984 the institution was restored and since then the festival is held annually in the months of February and March. The festival closes with a horse parade, which is followed throughout the region
Easter: Chipiona has two penitential brotherhoods: 
the Sisterhood and Nazarene Brotherhood of Our Father Jesus Captive, dating from 1960. The Virgin of Sorrows is an eighteenth-century anonymous work. The Brotherhood performs penitence on the day of Holy Thursday.
the Brotherhood Holy Christ of Mercy, which performs penitence on Good Friday. The image of Christ of Mercy has enjoyed great popular support since the Great Lisbon Earthquake of November 1755, during which the image of Christ was paraded in supplication. This event is commemorated on 1 November each year, when the image of the Holy Christ of Mercy is paraded in a procession of thanksgiving. In 2006 the Brotherhood also paraded the image of Our Lady of Piety, to whom penitence is performed on Wednesday of Holy Week.
Pinar Pilgrimage: Pilgrimage to be held the first Sunday of June in the Pinar de la Villa, in which the Virgin of Regla del Pinar, after transferring prior three days prior to the Shrine of Our Lady of Regla, returns to its pine accompanied by horsemen, carts and the general public.
Our Lady of Mount Carmel: The patron saint of sailors is paraded on her feast day of 16 July, being taken out to sea at noon and paraded through the seas of the Villa. During the afternoon a procession through the main streets of the town ending with a fireworks display on the beach of the Sea Cross.
Evening Rule: They are dedicated to Our Lady of Regla and celebrated at the Shrine of Our Lady of Regla. Culminate with the release of Our Lady of Regla on September 8 and end with a fireworks display on the beach of Regla.
Halloween and Feast of All Saints: It is increasingly frequent in the evening of October 31 children out dressed as monsters and spooky to the streets to ask for candy door to door. On November 1, Feast of All Saints, takes place Thanksgiving procession of the Holy Christ of Mercy, due to the miracle performed in Lisbon tsunami.
Christmas: The city is decorated with Christmas lights. In 2003 formed the Association of Bethlehem "Caepionis" which made many activities, such as cribs courses, conducting Cartel Christmas, a live nativity scene, Bethlehem contest or the Proclamation of Christmas. Zambobás are traditional organized by the different neighborhoods and village associations. On the afternoon of January 5 takes the Three Majesties Kings of the East, which since 2009 is the Child worship of God in the Plaza Pio XII.

See also 
 Chipiona Light

References

External links 

 Ayuntamiento de Chipiona
 Sistema de Información Multiterritorial de Andalucía: Chipiona
 Patrimonio cultural de Chipiona en la base de datos del Patrimonio Inmueble de Andalucía. Instituto Andaluz del Patrimonio Histórico
 Guía de turismo de Chipiona
 Fotos de Chipiona

Costa de la Luz
Municipalities of the Province of Cádiz
Port cities and towns on the Spanish Atlantic coast